Quentin Jacquet is a Grand Prix motorcycle racer from France.

Career statistics

By season

Races by year
(key)

References

External links
 Profile on motogp.com

1991 births
French motorcycle racers
Living people
125cc World Championship riders